The 2015–16 season is the 95th season in Deportivo Alavés ’s history and the 37th in the second-tier.

Squad

Out on loan

Competitions

Overall

Liga

League table

Matches
Kickoff times are in CET.

Copa del Rey

2ndround

3rd round

References

Deportivo Alavés seasons
Deportivo Alaves